McCarty Creek is a stream in Vernon and Barton counties, in the U.S. state of Missouri. It is a tributary to Clear Creek.

The stream headwaters arise in northern Vernon County about two miles northwest of Milford The stream flows north-northeast to enter southeastern Vernon County about four miles from the source. It continues passing east of Bellamy and west of Montevallo to its confluence with Clear Creek about eight miles southwest of El Dorado Springs.

McCarty Creek was named for a pioneer who settled there in the 1830s.

See also
List of rivers of Missouri

References

Rivers of Barton County, Missouri
Rivers of Vernon County, Missouri
Rivers of Missouri